The Bronco All Terrain Tracked Carrier (ATTC) is a twin chassis multi-purpose tracked articulated vehicle jointly developed by ST Kinetics and the Defence Science and Technology Agency (DSTA) for the Singapore Army. The variant which was in service as a UOR with the British Armed Forces is known as the Warthog.

Design
Designed to traverse difficult terrain, the Bronco has a ground pressure of 60 kPa and is fitted with heavy-duty seamless rubber tracks and a running gear system for soft ground conditions and directional stability. Swimming operations require minimal preparation and it can achieve a swimming speed of 5 km/h. The Bronco's four-sprocket drive, fully articulated steering with optional differential lock provides for small turning radius manoeuvres and improved performance.

An advantage the standard Bronco has over other western armoured personnel carriers is its relatively large interior, with seating for 16 including the driver, dependent on percentile measurements.

At the DSEI 2017 exhibit, ST Kinetics announced that the Bronco 3 has been fully developed and a static model was made available.

Deployment
The Bronco has been in service with the Singapore Armed Forces for several years, with more than 600 delivered.

British service

In December 2008, ST Kinetics was awarded a £150 million single source contract by the British Ministry of Defence for over 100 Bronco All Terrain Tracked Carriers for use in Afghanistan under an Urgent Operational Requirement (UOR). The vehicles, known as Warthog in British service, supplemented the similar BvS 10 Viking vehicles operating in southern Afghanistan by the British military, and was procured as part of a £700 million package of Urgent Operational Requirements (UORs) announced by Defence Secretary John Hutton. Deliveries began in the third quarter of 2009 and finished in 2010.

Four Warthog variants were built under the contract – Troop Carrier, Ambulance, Command, and Repair & Recovery. A different engine was used, a Caterpillar C7 turbocharged 6-cylinder diesel delivering 350 hp. The ambulance variant is capable of carrying casualties, medics and kit. Warthog's repair and recovery variant is fitted with a crane and winch, and has the capability to tow another 18-tonne Warthog vehicle back from the front line.

Once delivered to the UK, contractor Thales fitted the vehicles according to MoD specifications with Bowman communications systems, specialist electronic counter-measure equipment and extra protective armour including bar armour, protected seats for occupants at their facility in the former MoD depot at Llangennech near Llanelli, South Wales. The first vehicles arrived in service to Afghanistan in mid-2010.

In December 2010, British Army soldier – Lance Corporal William Reeks – survived an IED attack after the Warthog he was travelling in set off an improvised explosive device believed to be . His family believes that the stronger armour of the Warthogs, which replaced less heavily fortified Viking armoured vehicles prior to their protection upgrades, helped save their son's life.

Warthog continued in British service in Helmand Province until the closure of Camp Bastion in 2015. It was crewed throughout its use in Afghanistan by soldiers exclusively from the Royal Armoured Corps. The last Warthog Group came from C (the Duke of Edinburgh) Squadron, the Queen's Royal Hussars.

Jane's military guide has reported that British Warthog vehicles will be transformed to serve as transporter vehicles for Thales Watchkeeper UAV manned by 32nd Regiment Royal Artillery and 47th Regiment Royal Artillery under the Army 2020 concept. A March 2016 Jane's report stated the British army replaced the Warthog in October 2015, as it was specifically for use in Afghanistan operations.

Variants

Singapore has already deployed several variants of the Bronco, including ambulance, engineer, repair and recovery, load carrier, troop carrier and fuel resupply vehicles.

Mortar Tracked Carrier
A variant of the Bronco All-Terrain Tracked Carrier, the Mortar Tracked Carrier (MTC) is jointly developed by the SAF, DSTA and Singapore Technologies Kinetics. Operating on a 4 men crew, the MTC's primary weapon is the ST Kinetics 120mm Super Rapid Advanced Mortar System (SRAMS), the world's first recoiled mortar to incorporate a blast diffuser, greatly reducing the blast overpressure effect generated by mortars, thus allowing longer periods of firing without injuring the crew. The MTC has a built-in Automatic Fire Control System (AFCS) comprising a Fire Control Unit and an inertial navigation system, allowing it to conduct immediate deployment without conventional surveying methods. A hydro-pneumatic Recoil System reduces the overall recoil force, thus allowing minimal reinforcement of the original hull structure, and post-firing stabilising time. This increases the rate of firing with improved accuracy.

The AFCS is also equipped with a Mortar Platoon Management System (MPMS), which enables it to be networked via the Battlefield Management System (BMS).

Operators

Current operators
 
 Singapore Army
 
 Royal Thai Army – 4

Former operators 
 
 British Army

See also
BvS 10 – the vehicle supplemented by the Bronco in British Army service. BvS10 remains in service with 5 Nations.
Sisu Nasu - Finnish tracked ATV
Bandvagn 206 - Swedish tracked ATV currently in service
Vityaz (ATV) - large, Soviet tracked ATV

References
Notes

Christopher F Foss (2009-02-22) First public showing for STK’s Warthog Retrieved 2009-10-10.

External links

Manufacturer's website
One35th.com

Amphibious military vehicles
Tracked amphibious vehicles
Two-section tracked all-terrain vehicles
Combat vehicles of Singapore
Armoured fighting vehicles of the United Kingdom
Military vehicles introduced in the 2000s